Descartes Publishing is an athletics magazine publisher based in Peterborough, England. Descartes currently publishes five magazines, comprising Athletics Weekly, The Coach, British Runner, The Great Run Magazine, and Play Better Golf. The company was founded in 1999 by Matthew Fraser Moat, and began by purchasing the license to publish Athletics Weekly. The company purchased the title outright from Emap, the previous owners, in 2003.  In 2010, Athletics Weekly was acquired by Richard Hughes from Descartes and moved to a new business called Athletics Weekly Limited.

References 
Magazine publishing companies of the United Kingdom
Publishing companies of England
Companies based in Peterborough